Castrejón may refer to:

Apaxtla de Castrejón, city and seat of the municipality of Apaxtla, in the state of Guerrero, south-western Mexico
Castrejón de la Peña, municipality located in the province of Palencia, Castile and León, Spain
Francisco Castrejón (born 1947), former Mexican football (soccer) goalkeeper
Mambrilla de Castrejón, municipality located in the province of Burgos, Castile and León, Spain

de:Castrejón
es:Castrejón